Dernburg is a surname. Notable people with the surname include:

Abby Dernburg, American biologist
Bernhard Dernburg (1865–1937), German politician and banker
Ernst Dernburg (1887–1969), German actor
 (1833-1911), German author
Heinrich Dernburg (1829–1907), German jurist, professor, and politician